Loch of Huxter is a loch of southeastern Whalsay, Shetland Islands, Scotland, to the southwest of the village of Huxter.  There is a water pumping station on its bank. Huxter Fort is located on an islet to the southeast of the loch, connected by a causeway.

References

Huxter